This is The Misunderstood's discography.

1960s singles
"You Don't Have to Go" (Jimmy Reed) / "Who's Been Talkin'" (Chester Burnett) (Blue Sound Co. M-13, 4/66)
"I Can Take You to the Sun" (Hill/Brown) / "Who Do You Love?" (Ellas McDaniel) (Fontana TF-777, 12/66)
"Children of the Sun" (Hill/Brown) / "I Unseen" (Nâzım Hikmet) (Fontana TF-998, 2/69)
"You're Tuff Enough" (Daniels, Moore) / "Little Red Rooster" (Willie Dixon) (Fontana TF-1028, 5/69)
"Never Had a Girl (Like You Before)" (Campbell/Hoard) / "Golden Glass" (Campbell/Hoard) (Fontana TF-1041, 7/69)

Children of the Sun
7" Vinyl 45rpm EP: Children of the Sun (Cherry Red Records CHERRY22, 5/81)
Children of the Sun (Hill/Brown)
Who Do You Love (McDaniel)
I Can Take You to the Sun (Hill/Brown)

Before the Dream Faded
Vinyl album and CD: Before the Dream Faded (Cherry Red BRED32, 4/82)
Produced by Dick Leahy, recorded 1966 in London at Fontana Studios and IBC
Children of the Sun (Tony Hill, Rick Brown)
My Mind (Hill, Brown)
Who Do You Love (Ellas McDaniel)
I Unseen (Hill, lyrics from Nâzım Hikmet)
Find the Hidden Door (Hill, Brown)
I Can Take You to the Sun (Hill, Brown)
1965 USA recordings (preserved from acetate)
I'm Not Talkin' (Mose Allison)
Who's Been Talkin' (Chester Burnett)
I Need Your Love (Greg Treadway, Brown)
You Don’t Have to Go (Jimmy Reed)
I Cried My Eyes Out (Treadway, Brown)
Like I Do (Treadway, Brown)
You've Got Me Crying Over Love (hidden track)

The Legendary Gold Star Album
Vinyl album and CD: The Legendary Gold Star Album (Cherry Red CDMRED142, 1997)

CD 1: The Legendary Gold Star Album - Produced by John Peel, recorded early 1966 in Hollywood, California at Gold Star Studios.
Blues with a Feeling
Who's Been Talkin'
You Got Me Dizzy
You Don't Have to Go
Goin' to New York
Shake Your Money Maker
I Just Want to Make Love to You
I'm Not Talkin'

CD 2 (Bonus CD): Golden Glass
Never Had a Girl (Like You Before)
Golden Glass
I Don't Want to Discuss It
Little Red Rooster
You're Tuff Enough
Freedom
Keep on Running
I'm Cruising

The Lost Acetates 1965-66
Vinyl album and CD: The Lost Acetates 1965-66 (Ugly Things Records [USA] UTCD-2201, 2004)
William Locy Sound, Riverside, California, July 1965-January 1966
She Got Me (version 2) (Treadway/Brown)
Don't Bring Me Down (The Animals' arrangement)
Bury My Body (Original arrangement)
Why? (Treadway/Brown)
Got Love If You Want It (The Kinks' arrangement)
She Got Me (version 1) (Treadway/Brown)
End of Time (Treadway)
Thunder & Lightning (Hoyt Axton)
I Unseen (version 1) (Nâzım Hikmet) (riff by Whiting)
Gold Star Studios, Hollywood, California, April 1966 
Who's Been Talkin' (Chester Burnett)
Demos, IBC Studios, London, September 9, 1966
My Mind (Hill/Brown)
Find the Hidden Door (Hill/Brown)
Children of the Sun (Hill/Brown)
I Unseen (version 2) (Nâzım Hikmet) (Original arrangement with riff by Whiting)

Broken Road
CD: Broken Road (Cherry Red CDMRED147, 1998) Produced by Kevin Reach, recorded 1981-83 in Hollywood; contains lyrics by Austin Gordon and Kevin Reach.
When the Prophet Comes (Brown, Campbell & Gordon)
Child! (Brown, Campbell & Gordon)
Carry Me Far (Brown, Campbell & Gordon)
Peace of Mind (Brown, Campbell & Gordon)
Children of the Sun (Hill/Brown)
I Unseen (Nâzım Hikmet) (Original arrangement: Steve Whiting)
Smile on Me! (Campbell/Brown)
No Survivors II (Brown, Campbell, Gordon & Reach)
Queen of Madness (Brown, Campbell & Gordon)
No Survivors I (Brown, Campbell & Gordon)
When the Prophet Comes (Brown, Campbell & Gordon)
Let Us Influence You (Campbell/Brown)
Broken Road (Campbell)
Mona (Live) (Ellas McDaniel)

Compilations
Nuggets II (Original Artyfacts From the British Empire and Beyond 1964-1969) - Performer
Acid Drops, Spacedust & Flying Saucers: Psychedelic Confectionery - Performer
Pillows & Prayers, Vol. 1 - Performer
Pillows & Prayers, Vol. 2 - Performer
Acid: Final Frontier - Performer
In Search of Space: 60's to 70's, Vol. 3 - Performer
And the Heavens Cried - Performer
Rare Trax, Vol. 32: Eight Miles High...US Psychedelic Underground from the 60's and 70's - Performer
Ghetto South - Vocals (sample)

References

Misunderstood, The
Rock music group discographies